The World Allround Speed Skating Championships for Men took place on 1 and 2 March 1980 in Heerenveen at the Thialf ice rink.

Title holder was the American Eric Heiden.

Result

 DQ = Disqualified

Source:

References

World Allround Speed Skating Championships, 1980
1980 World Allround

Attribution
In Dutch